Harry Lincoln Sayler (1863–1913) was a newspaperman and novelist, under his own name and pseudonyms, including as a ghost writer for a popular youth fiction series.

Sayler graduated from DePauw University. He married June Elliott of Shelbyville, Indiana in 1889. They had two children. By occupation Sayler was a newsman, starting in 1886 in Indianapolis. By 1889 he was working in Chicago, eventually becoming general manager of the City News Bureau of Chicago. Sayler was interested in history and became a member of the Illinois State Historical Society, the Chicago Historical Association, and the Louisiana Historical Association. He developed an expertise on the subject of pirates.

Sayler wrote three series of juvenile fiction relating to the then-novel technology of airplanes and flight. He wrote the Boy Scouts of the Air series under the pen name Gordon Stuart, the Aeroplane Boys series as Ashton Lamar, and the Airship Boys series under his own name.

Sayler also wrote for another juvenile series, the Boys' Big Game series, under the pseudonym Elliott Whitney.

Works

Boy Scouts of the Air series 

The Boy Scouts of the Air at Greenwood School (1912)
The Boy Scouts of the Air in Belgium (1915)
The Boy Scouts of the Air on Lost Island (1917)
Boy Scouts of the Air with Pershing (1919)
The Boy Scouts of the Air at Cape Peril (1921)

The Aeroplane Boys series 

Lamar, Ashton (1912). When Scout Meets Scout; or, The Aeroplane Spy.

The Airship Boys series 

The last volume in this series was not written by Sayler.

Boys' Big Game series

References

External links 

 
 
 

1863 births
1913 deaths
DePauw University alumni
American male writers